Darren Knott, also known as DK, is a British disc jockey and record producer on the Ninja Tune independent record label.

DK began working for Ninja Tune, performing remixes of Coldcut's track "Timber" (1998).

In 2001, along with DJ Food, he released the first album in the Solid Steel mix series, Solid Steel Presents: Now, Listen!, and the most recent, Solid Steel Presents: Now, Listen Again!.

He has toured with Coldcut, Kid Koala and DJ Food members PC and Strictly Kev. He has also appeared as the opening act for The Prodigy.

He regularly performs live sets at the Ninja club and Xen Solid Steel nights, and also presented and produced Coldcut's infamous Solid Steel Show. He was instrumental in syndicating the show to over 30 radio stations worldwide.

References

External links
 DK's page on Ninja Tune's official site

English DJs
English record producers
Ninja Tune artists
Year of birth missing (living people)
Place of birth missing (living people)
Living people